Barbamine is a genus of flowering plants belonging to the family Brassicaceae.

Its native range is Turkey to Caucasus.

Species:

Barbamine ketzkhovelii 
Barbamine sachokiana

References

Brassicaceae
Brassicaceae genera